Ferdinand David's Concertino for Trombone and Orchestra, Op. 4, was composed in 1837.
It was dedicated to Karl Traugott Queisser, who was a good friend of David, and also played in the Gewandhaus Orchestra, where David was concertmeister.

The piece was premiered at the Gewandhaus with Queisser playing the solo part and Mendelssohn conducting. It was an immediate success.

It consists of 3 movements:
I. Allegro maestoso
II. Marcia funebre (Andante)
III. Allegro maestoso.

This score is written for the following instruments:

Solo Trombone, 2 Flutes, 2 Oboes, 2 Clarinets 2 Bassoons, 4 Horns,  2 Trumpets in Eb, 3 Trombones, Timpani, and Strings

The second movement was arranged for Violin and Piano by David and was played at his own funeral.

A performance of the concerto usually lasts around 16–17 minutes.

The piece has been recorded by Brett Baker, Michel Becquet, Michael Bertoncello, Cristian Ganicenco, Jürgen Heinel, Massimo La Rosa, Carl Lenthe, Christian Lindberg, Jacques Mauger, Armin Rosin, and Branimir Slokar, among others.

References

External links
Lessons on David's Concertino for Trombone and Orchestra
 
 "Trombone Concertino": Score at The Brook Centrer Eighteenth-Century Symphony Archive

Compositions by Ferdinand David
David
1837 compositions
David